Peperomia villicaulis is a species of plant from the genus Peperomia. It was first described by Casimir de Candolle and published in the book "Botanische Jahrbücher für Systematik, Pflanzengeschichte und Pflanzengeographie 40: 264. 1908".

Distribution
It is endemic to Peru. First specimens were collected at an altitude of 2400-2700 meters.

Peru
Cusco
Machupicchu
Anta
Junin

Description
Leaves are shortly petiolate, broadest at the base, the bottom subnarrow, the obtuse tip on both sides, densely and appreciably covered in vili. It is 5-veined. The 5 central veins are visible; pedunculate axillary spikes, flowering 1/2 longer than the leaves, densely flowered, hairy peduncles; an orbicular plate pedicled in the center; filaments of elliptic anthers surpassing; ovary emergent, obovate a little below the stigmatiferous tip, stigma glabrous. Stony grass. Branched densely haired stems are 3 millimeters thick. Branches are about 25 centimeters long. Internodes are 2 centimeters long. The leaves are opposite. The stems are stiff and opaque when dry, up to 2 1/2 centimeters long and 16 millimeters wide. Petiole 2-millimeter peduncle is 5 millimeters long. Flowering spikes 3 1/2 centimeters long, 1 millimeter thick.

References

villicaulis
Flora of Peru
Plants described in 1908
Taxa named by Casimir de Candolle